NBIC may refer to:

 Acronym for the fields of Nanotechnology, Biotechnology, Information technology and Cognitive science
 Namibia Business Innovation Center (see Namibia University of Science and Technology)
 NanKang Biotech Incubation Center
 Nano/Bio Interface Center, University of Pennsylvania
 National Board Inspection Code (see National Board of Boiler and Pressure Vessel Inspectors)
 Netherlands Bioinformatics Centre